Anna Ridler (born 1985) is an artist and researcher who lives and works in London. She works with collections of information or data, particularly self-generated data sets, to create new and unusual narratives in a variety of mediums.

Her work has been exhibited widely at cultural institutions including the Victoria and Albert Museum, Tate Modern, Barbican Centre, Centre Pompidou, The Photographers' Gallery, ZKM Center for Art and Media Karlsruhe, and Ars Electronica.

Biography
Born in London in 1985, Ridler spent her childhood raised between Atlanta, Georgia and the United Kingdom. She obtained a Bachelor of Arts in English Literature and Language from Oxford University in 2007 and a Master of Arts in Information Experience Design from the Royal College of Art in 2017.

Art 
A core element of Ridler's work lies in the creation of handmade data sets through a laborious process of selecting and classifying images and text. By creating her own data sets, Ridler is able to uncover and expose underlying themes and concepts while also inverting the usual process of scraping pre-classified images found in large databases on the internet. Her interests are in drawing, machine learning, data collection, storytelling, and technology.

Selected works
Some of Anna Ridler's most notable works to date fall within her ‘tulip series’ which explores the hysteria around tulip mania and compares it to the speculation and bubbles surrounding cryptocurrencies. The series is expressed in three forms: a photographic dataset in Myriad (Tulips), 2018; two iterations of machine generated videos in Mosaic Virus (2018) and Mosaic Virus (2019); and a website with an accompanied functioning decentralized application in Bloemenveiling (2019).

Myriad (Tulips) (2018) 

Myriad (Tulips) (2018) is an installation of ten thousand hand-labeled photographs forming a dataset of unique tulips. The ten thousand, or myriad of, photographs were taken by Ridler over the course of three months, roughly the length of a tulip season, spent in Utrecht. Each photograph is carefully affixed one by one with magnets to a specially painted black wall in a laborious process to form a seemingly precise grid.

Myriad (Tulips) (2018) has been exhibited in AI: More than Human, Barbican Centre, London, UK (May 16 - August 26, 2019); Error—The Art of Imperfection, Ars Electronica Export, Berlin, Germany (November 17, 2018 – March 3, 2019); Peer to Peer, Shanghai Centre of Photography, Shanghai, China (December 8 - February 9, 2020).

The work was featured in Bloomberg, It’s Nice That, and Hyperallergic.

For Myriad (Tulips), Ridler was nominated for a Beazley Design of the Year award for her presentation of an alternative perspective on how to engage with artificial intelligence; demonstrating a departure from ownership and control of major corporations to a more personalized process of constructing and conceptualizing from the ground-up.

Mosaic Virus (2018, 2019) 

Mosaic Virus (2018) is a single screen video installation displaying a grid of continually evolving tulips in bloom. For Mosaic Virus (2019) Ridler used three screens. The appearance of the tulips is controlled by artificial intelligence using fluctuations in the price of bitcoin. The stripes on the tulips' petals reflect the value of the cryptocurrency. Ridler draws parallels with the tulip mania of the 17th century; representing the hysteria and speculation around crypto-currencies. The work takes its name from the mosaic virus which caused stripes in tulip petals, subsequently increasing their desirability and leading to speculative prices.

Ridler trained a general adversarial network (GAN) on the set of ten thousand photographs of individual tulips from her work Myriad (Tulips). She used a technique called spectral normalization to improve the output.

The work was exhibited in Error—The Art of Imperfection, Ars Electronica Export, Berlin, Germany (November 17, 2018 – March 3, 2019).

Bloemenveiling (2019) 
Bloemenveiling (2019) is an auction of artificial-intelligence-generated tulips on the blockchain in the form of a functioning decentralized application: http://bloemenveiling.bid. Ridler collaborated with senior research scientist at DeepMind, David Pfau to investigate whether blockchain could be used as a means of finding poetic substance within it. The piece interrogates the way technology drives human desire and economic dynamics by creating artificial scarcity.

In the work, short moving image pieces of tulips created by generative adversarial networks are sold at auction using smart contracts on the Ethereum network. Each time a tulip is sold, thousands of computers around the world all work to verify the transaction, checking each other's work against each other. While the artificial intelligence behind the moving image pieces has the potential to generate infinite flowers, the enormous distributed network is used, at great environmental cost, to introduce scarcity to an otherwise limitless resource.

Bloemenveiling was exhibited in Entangled Realities, HEK Basel, Basel, Switzerland in 2019.

References

1985 births
Living people
Artificial intelligence art
Artists from London
Alumni of the Royal College of Art
Alumni of the University of Oxford
21st-century British women artists